Bruce David Forbes (born March 30, 1948) is an ordained minister in the United Methodist Church. Born in Michigan, he grew up in Mitchell, South Dakota.  His parents, Ernest Linwood Forbes and Marie Louise Forbes, met in Rochester.  Ernie eventually became a hospital administrator at Methodist Hospital in Mitchell.  Marie was a mathematics teacher as well as a librarian.

Bruce Forbes holds a BA in Religious Studies from Morningside College, an MTh from Perkins School of Theology at Southern Methodist University, and a PhD from Princeton Theological Seminary. His formal academic training is in the history of Christianity, but he has also developed a special interest in the analysis of popular culture.

He is the co-editor of two books: "Religion and Popular Culture in America" (2000, revised edition 2005) and "Rapture, Revelation and the End Times: An Exploration of the Left Behind Series" (2004) . He is also the author of two non-fiction books. Christmas: A Candid History, (2007) and America's Favorite Holidays: Candid Histories (2015).

Forbes, a former department chair and professor of religious studies at Morningside College in Sioux City, Iowa, is a member of Alternatives'  board of directors. Morningside College offers three different awards for outstanding teaching, one chosen by a student honor society, one by a faculty committee, and one by outside evaluators.  Forbes has received all three awards, and he has received the student award twice. In addition to his teaching, he is a frequent guest speaker at local churches, workshops, and regional conferences.

Forbes resides in Sioux City, Iowa and has one son, Matthew Forbes.

Forbes is a member of The Auggie Group (established 2004); other founding members include: The Rev (Charles) Rusty Brace, Tamara Huf and Corinne Schuster.

Articles 
A Washington Post article about the Left Behind series, using Forbes as a main source

References

1948 births
Living people
Morningside University alumni
Southern Methodist University alumni
Princeton Theological Seminary alumni